Daniel Victor Lauwers (born January 15, 1963) is a member of the Michigan Senate, representing the 25th district. He previously served in the Michigan House of Representatives and represented the 81st district, made up of the areas just south of Port Huron, Michigan along the St. Clair River, that are functional suburbs of Detroit with additional business related to the water tourism, combined with an inland area to the west of Port Huron that is largely still rural farm country with small towns that largely function as trade centers, and only very limited influx of commuters to the Metro-Detroit area.

Lauwers comes from the more rural western portion of the district, and has a bachelor's degree in agricultural economics from Michigan State University. Lauwers owns Eastern Michigan Grain. He was a legislative assistant to Bill Schuette when Schutte was in the US House of Representatives. Lauwers was first elected to the state house in 2012. He also runs Nick Lauwers Farms with his son Nick.

References

1963 births
21st-century American politicians
Businesspeople from Michigan
Living people
Republican Party members of the Michigan House of Representatives
Republican Party Michigan state senators
Michigan State University alumni
People from Almont, Michigan